National Route 309 is a national highway of Japan connecting Kumano, Mie and Hirano-ku, Osaka in Japan, with a total length of 145.5 km (90.41 mi).

References

National highways in Japan
Roads in Mie Prefecture
Roads in Nara Prefecture
Roads in Osaka Prefecture